Ivan Vasilyevich Lyakh (born 14 January 1960) is a Russian professional football coach and a former player.

He is the father of Andrei Lyakh.

External links
 

1960 births
Living people
Soviet footballers
Russian footballers
FC Lada-Tolyatti players
FC Rostov players
Russian football managers
FC Shinnik Yaroslavl managers
FC Baltika Kaliningrad managers
Russian Premier League managers
People from Kagalnitsky District
FC Taganrog players
Association football defenders
FC Tekstilshchik Ivanovo players
Sportspeople from Rostov Oblast